Ironstone mining in Cleveland and North Yorkshire occurred on a sizeable scale from the 1830s to the 1960s in present day eastern parts of North Yorkshire but has been recorded as far back as Roman times in mostly a small-scale and intended for local use. This Cleveland is not to be confused with a smaller area covered by the county of Cleveland from 1974-96.

Around the year 1850, large seams of ironstone were discovered in the Cleveland Hills, later also in and around Rosedale and Eskdale. Mining of these seams accelerated an industry around the River Tees's south eastern banks and around the River Tyne, where many new ironworks were built. Settlements around the Tees and Tyne, especially the Cleveland town of Middlesbrough (on the Tees) as  iron and steel processing centres. These received large amounts of ironstone, first by ship and later by railway. The industry experienced a meteoric rise, in the space of twenty years (by 1870), ironstone from the Cleveland part of Yorkshire was supplying 38% of the steel and iron requirements of Britain.

Ironstone workings in Yorkshire's Cleveland declined from the 1930s onwards, imported iron ore was able to be shipped in vast quantities to the quaysides at Middlesbrough and on the Tyne. The last commercially operated ironstone mine was near Skelton-in-Cleveland, the North Skelton Mine, closed in January 1964. Restoration programmes have remediated some mine sites and they have been opened to public access, mine water has polluted some watercourses in the area.

History

Table of output (1857–1880)
The list covers all the ironstone mines in the Cleveland Ironstone Formation, and as such, extends into parts of North Yorkshire that were not traditionally designated as being in Cleveland. The list only covers areas of productive ironstone mining, and so does not include test areas (ie Goldsborough on the North Yorkshire coast where drilling was undertaken for three years from 1912). Ironstone production helped fuel the industrial revolution with smelters and ironworks in Middlesbrough accounting for 33% of iron and steel production in Britain in 1865. By 1870, Britain was supplying about half of all the iron and steel across the world; 38% of that, was made from iron mined in the Cleveland Hills and North Yorkshire. The table below shows the combined production of ironstone from the Cleveland Hills between 1857 and 1880.

Early history
Evidence of iron working in the area dates back as far as the Roman times, with an ironworks at Levisham working iron believed to have been sourced from  Rosedale. The iron from the Cleveland seams is known to have been worked in Eskdale prior to 1750. A farm at Danby was marked on mapping as Furnace Farm and had evidence of scoria heaps (slag). Other slag heaps have been found in Glaisdale (that pre-date the Victorian ironworks) and Fryup Dale too. Other workings south of Goathland, known as the Killing Pits also show evidence of having been worked in the post-Medieval period, but before the 19th century industrial extraction of ironstone in the area.

Nodules of ironstone were quarried from the beaches and cliffs between Staithes and Kettleness since the 1830s, but this was at the mercy of the weather and the tides as the ironstone was transported by sea. Most of the ironstone collected on the Yorkshire Coast was shipped to ironworks in, and around, the Newcastle area, using sea and river transport for a large part of its journey. When large-scale mining was introduced, most of the mining areas were connected to the railway network either by their own lines or via a narrow gauge railway which connected to main railway network. A small number used direct sea transportation, but in the end, they closed down or converted to railway operation. The growth of the railway system in North Yorkshire actually led to the discovery of ironstone in the area, when the Whitby and Pickering Railway reached Grosmont in 1835, with shipping of ironstone from Grosmont, via the railway, then ship from Whitby harbour, in 1836.

Quarrying and mining on the Yorkshire coast for alum was commonplace, but this industry was dying out in the latter half of the 19th century when it was discovered that alum could be sourced from colliery waste. The boom in the ironstone industry meant that some communities had a new occupational lifeline. The discovery of the Eston ironstone by Henry Bolckow and John Vaughan in 1850, accelerated the industrialisation of the area as the ironstone outcropped quite close to the surface and could be recovered more easily than on the coast, which was dependent on the tides, and from the mines further south, which had to go to greater depths to recover the stone. In August 1850, the find of stone was proved, and by December of the same year, the first shipment of ironstone, was taken over a newly built tramway from Eston into Middlesbrough. The Rosedale mines developed in the 1860s, and were connected via a railway that ran across the moors, and down a steep incline near Ingleby Greenhow, which then joined with the main railway network at what would become  railway station. The ore at Rosedale was roasted with coal (calcined) to remove impurities and lessen the overall weight of the ore, so that the transportation costs were cheaper, as the companies had to pay the landowners per tonne of ore transported over the railway.

Peak production
Production across the region as whole peaked in 1883, when  of ore was processed. After that, the tonnages declined steadily. In 1936, the contribution to UK steel production from the north east was 27.3%, but by this time, much of the ore was being imported. Apart from a dip in 1922, the smelters on Teesside first started using a greater proportion of imported ore over that which was mined locally, in 1936.

Production of ironstone in the area declined as opencast and quarried ironstone from domestic UK locations became prevalent due to it being cheaper to quarry than mining. For example, the ironstone workings in Northamptonshire were all surface operations, therefore it could be mechanised easier without the need for timber props, nor the time and labour required to install the timbers. This meant that by the interwar years, Northamptonshire iron ore was five shillings per tonne cheaper to transport than Cleveland ore. Additionally, the global recession in the early 1920s led to a drop in the price of iron. Closures were further exacerbated by imported iron ore. The last industrial operation of mining ore in the area was at North Skelton, which closed in January 1964.

Occurrence

Apportioning strict geography to the area is different according to various sources; most agree, however, that the Cleveland Hills (or the Cleveland District) is tied in with the occurrence of the ironstone in whatever seam and thus extends from the Tees at Middlesbrough in the north, to the Vale of Pickering in the south. The North Sea coast provides the eastern limit, while the Scugdale Valley down through Felixkirk to Thirsk is seen as the western border.

Mining of ironstone can be grouped into three distinct localities; Cleveland mines which worked the main Cleveland seam, the Rosedale mines, which worked the Dogger seam and those grouped around Grosmont and the Esk Valley which worked the Avicula and Pecten seams. The exceptions to this rule are those on the coast south of Boulby (particularly Port Mulgrave) which worked the Dogger seam, and several localities that worked the Two-Foot Seam. Those mining concerns in the eastern part of Cleveland, entered around Brotton and Loftus, worked the ironstone band where it dipped in a depression, and so were the ones most likely to need shaft and deep mining experience.

Both the Avicula and Pecten seams were named after a type of fossil found in the stone, avicula cygnipes, (swan), and pecten, (scallop) respectively. The various seams had different names in places, sometimes on account of their geology, others due to a confusion of which seam was being mined; the Avicula seam was also known as the Low Seam due to its position, the Pecten seam was sometimes called the Shelly Seam due to the abundance of shells within it.

Recovery of ironstone varied with location; most of the early mines centred around Grosmont used a system known as the double-stall. Others used the longwall method, whereas most mines and drifts winning stone from the Main Seam, used the pillar and bord way of mining.

Mines

Iron and steelworks
Some of the mines roasted their iron ore, which enriched the final product before leaving the mine area, this being most notable at Rosedale where the former kilns are part of the heritage of the area and are listed as a scheduled monument. An ironworks was built at Skinningrove, which produced pig iron from ore mined at Loftus, just across Kilton Beck. Whilst Loftus Mine closed in 1958, the plant is still operational, producing steel profiles with raw steel railed in from primary smelters located in Lincolnshire.

Many of the companies that were working the ironstone, also had limestone and coal ventures in other parts of the north-east region, this allowed for the iron and steelworks to proliferate on the south bank of the River Tees. This, combined with the ability to ship pig iron from the docks at a cheap rate led to the ironstone and pig iron industry on south Teesside being the most prolific in output for England and Scotland. Other major iron and steel centres in Northamptonshire, Shropshire and Staffordshire had overland transport costs.

Aftermath

Several becks on the coast have been affected by pollution. As the mines closed down, so the pumps were turned off and this stopped the contaminated water being pumped away. Kilton Beck has been badly affected by this, with tales of how locals could fish in the beck, but it spent a good part of the second half of the 20th century heavily poisoned and was described as being ochre in colour. It has since been remediated by a system of oxidating the ferrous content in the water. In the North York Moors National Park, remediation ponds have been created at Six Howe and Clitherbeck, which have helped to reduce the iron pollution in local watercourses.

Progressive closure of the mines also led to mass unemployment; Skinningrove was a very small fishing village, fairly isolated from the rest of Cleveland when the ironstone boom arrived. After closure of the mines, unemployment levels surged. The miners' livelihoods were also affected by the slump in the early 1930s; one author noted that those who took part in the Jarrow March, were struck by an unemployment rate of 70%, in the East Cleveland ironstone communities, this was nearer 90%.

The closure of the ironstone mines also left a legacy of subsidence, which unlike the coal industry, had no official framework for compensation or remediation. The spoil tip at Kilton remains, and in 1990, was the subject of a public inquiry into whether the tip should be reclaimed. However, the inspector found that it "...was now a uniquely recognisable industrial archaeological relic in East Cleveland...[and] its retention far outweighed the benefits of its removal."

In 2017, a four-year project was started to preserve the remains and provide better access to the historic sites at Rosedale and Warren Moor. The project was allocated £3.8 million, and would also involve the protection of wildlife habitats on previous ironstone workings. Bridges on the original section of the Whitby to Pickering Railway between beck Hole and Grosmont, were renovated in 2020, with new boards by the site of Esk Valley Mine. This was done as part of the Land of Iron project.

In 1983, the Cleveland Ironstone Mining Museum was opened near to the Skinningrove Steelworks in a former ironstone drift mine. The museum also offers the opportunity for people to tour the drift part of the mine.

A monument to those who worked in the ironstone industry was unveiled in Skelton in April 2019. The sculpture is of three miners and is titled "The Spirit of East Cleveland".

Listed buildings

The mine buildings on the surface of Skelton Park pit are the most numerous of those which are listed with Historic England. These include the fanhouse, the main engine house, the powerhouse, the provender house, the secondary winding engine and the workshops. Other listed structures at other locations include:
Rosedale East Mines calcining kilns and iron mines – scheduled ancient monument
Skelton Shaft Mine explosives magazine – grade II listed
Skelton Shaft Mine Guibal fanhouse – grade II listed
Trustee Drift Level Mine – Powder Magazine and Adjoining Blast Walls – grade II listed
Warren Moor Mine chimney – grade II listed

See also
Bolckow, Vaughan
Cleveland Ironstone Formation
Grosmont ironworks
Losh, Wilson and Bell
Rosedale Railway

Gallery

Notes

References

Sources

External links
NMRS mapping showing location of mines
Colour map of the Cleveland and North Yorkshire geology

Mines in North Yorkshire
Underground mines in England
Mining in North Yorkshire
Redcar and Cleveland
Ironstone Mines in North Yorkshire